The Sanremo Music Festival 2019 was the 69th annual Sanremo Music Festival, a television song contest held in the Teatro Ariston of Sanremo and organised and broadcast by RAI. The show was held between 5 February 2019 and 9 February 2019. Claudio Baglioni was the artistic director of the contest, and co-hosted it with Virginia Raffaele and Claudio Bisio. 24 entries competed in one section only. Mahmood emerged as the winner of the festival with his song "Soldi".

Format

Presenters
Singer-songwriter and musician, Claudio Baglioni, who was also the competition's artistic director, hosted the Sanremo Music Festival for the second consecutive year, alongside co-hosts Claudio Bisio and Virginia Raffaele.

Voting
Voting during the five evenings occurred through different combinations of four methods:
 Public televoting, carried out via landline, mobile phone, the contest's official mobile app, and online voting.
 Press jury voting, expressed by accredited journalists that followed the competition from the Roof Hall at the Teatro Ariston.
 A demoscopic poll, composed of a sample of 300 music fans, which voted from their homes via an electronic voting system managed by Ipsos.
 Expert jury voting, resulting from points assigned by personalities from the world of music, entertainment and culture. The jury was composed by Mauro Pagani (president), Ferzan Özpetek, Camila Raznovich, Claudia Pandolfi, Elena Sofia Ricci, Beppe Severgnini, Serena Dandini and Joe Bastianich.

The three voting systems were distributed in the following percentages:
 First, Second and Third Evening: 40% Public televoting; 30% Demoscopic poll; 30% Press jury voting
 Fourth and Fifth Evening: 50% Public televoting; 30% Press jury voting; 20% Expert jury voting
In the final part of the fifth evening, a new rank indicating the first three acts -determined by the percentage of votes obtained in this evening's vote and those obtained in previous evenings- was drawn up.

Selections

Ecco Sanremo Giovani
Unlike previous editions, the Newcomers' section was not included in the Festival, but a similar selection was held to decree the two places reserved in the Big Artist section. The artists competing in the new format were selected through two separate contests: Standard section and Area Sanremo. The selection was preceded by four afternoon shows, conducted by Luca Barbarossa and Andrea Perroni, where the artists and their entries were presented.

Standard selection
On October 19, 2018, Rai Commission for Sanremo Music Festival 2019 announced a list of 677 acts, but only 69 artists coming from all Italian regions -excluding Basilicata and Valle d'Aosta- and from abroad were selected in the first phase.

On November 27, 2018, Rai Commission announced the eighteen finalists.

 Angelucci - "L'uomo che verrà"
 Andrea Biagioni - "Alba piena"
 Cannella - "Nei miei ricordi"
 Cordio - "La nostra vita"
 Diego Conti - "3 gradi"
 Einar - "Centomila Volte" 
 Federica Abbate - "Finalmente"
 Fosco17 - "Dicembre"
 Giulia Mutti - "Almeno tre"

 La Rua - "Alla mia età si vola"
 La Zero - "Nina è brava"
 Le Ore - "La mia felpa è come me"
 Mahmood - "Gioventù bruciata"
 Marte Marasco - "Nella mia testa"
 Nyvinne – "Io ti penso" 
 Ros - "Incendio"
 Symo - "Paura d'amare"
 Wepro - "Stop/Replay"

Area Sanremo
After the auditions, RAI Commission - composed by Claudio Baglioni, Claudio Fasulo, Duccio Forzano, Massimo Giuliano, Massimo Martelli and Geoff Westley- identified 6 finalists for the competition among the 225 acts:

 Deschema - "Cristallo"
 Fedrix & Flaw - "L'impresa"
 Francesca Miola - "Amarsi non serve"

 Mescalina - "Chiamami amore adesso"
 Saita – "Niwrad" 
 Sisma - "Slow motion"

Sanremo Giovani 2018 
On December 20 and 21, 2018, the twenty four finalists performed their songs at Sanremo Casino in Sanremo, with the show Sanremo Giovani 2018 broadcast on Rai 1 presented by Pippo Baudo and Fabio Rovazzi. The two winners of the nights participated in Sanremo 2019 with a new entry. Einar and Mahmood were selected as the winners.

Big Artists section
The Big Artists section of the contest reverted to 24 artists, after briefly going up to 22 the previous year. Like the previous year, there were no eliminations during the four weeknight shows. All the artists performed several times and were scored during the week, but every competing artist advanced to the final night.

Competing entries

Shows

First evening
The 24 Big Artists each performed their song for the first time.

Second evening
The first twelve Big Artists each performed their song again.

Third evening
The other twelve Big Artists each performed their song for the second time.

Fourth evening
The 24 Big Artists performed their songs in a duet with a guest artist.

Fifth evening
The 24 Big Artists each performed their entry again for a final time. The top three faced a superfinal vote, then the winner of Sanremo 2019 was decided.

Superfinal

Special guests
The special guests of Sanremo Music Festival 2019 were:
 Singers / musicians: Alessandra Amoroso, Anastastio, Andrea Bocelli, Antonello Venditti, Elisa Toffoli, Eros Ramazzotti,  Fiorella Mannoia, Giorgia, Ligabue, Luis Fonsi, Marco Mengoni, Matteo Bocelli, Raf, Riccardo Cocciante, Tom Walker, Umberto Tozzi. 
 Actors / comedians / directors / models: Claudio Santamaria, Laura Chiatti, Mago Forest, Michelle Hunziker, Michele Riondino, Pio e Amedeo, Pierfrancesco Favino, Serena Rossi.
 Other notable figures: Fabio Rovazzi, Pippo Baudo, Simona Ventura.

Related shows

Prima Festival
Simone Montedoro e Anna Ferzetti hosted PrimaFestival, a side-show that aired on Rai 1 immediately after TG1. The show featured details, curiosities and news relating to Sanremo Music Festival 2019.

Dopo Festival
Rocco Papaleo, with the participation of Anna Foglietta and Melissa Greta Marchetto and a group of journalists of Italian press, hosted Dopofestival - The Dark Side of Sanremo a talk show that aired on Rai 1 immediately after Sanremo Music Festival. The show featured comments about the Festival as well as interviews to the singers competing in the song contest.

Broadcast and ratings

Local broadcast
Rai 1, Rai Premium and Rai Radio 2 are the official broadcasters of the festival in Italy. The show is also available in streaming via website on Rai Play.

Ratings Sanremo Music Festival 2019
The audience is referred to the one of Rai 1.

Ratings Prima Festival 2019

Ratings Dopo Festival 2019

International broadcast
The international television service Rai Italia broadcast the competition in the Americas, Africa, Asia and Australia. The contest was also streamed via the official Eurovision Song Contest website eurovision.tv.

Italy in the Eurovision Song Contest

The winners of the Big Artists category received the right to represent Italy at the Eurovision Song Contest 2019. However, winners are not obliged to take part in Eurovision, as seen in 2016 when Stadio declined to participate in the contest. In the event that the winner decides not to compete in the Eurovision Song Contest, RAI and the organisers of Sanremo Music Festival usually reserve the right to select the Italian entrant to themselves, in the case of 2016 selecting runner-up Francesca Michielin.

There was a former Italian Eurovision representative competing in the Big Artists category this year. Il Volo came 3rd in 2015 with Grande amore.

References

2019 in Italian television
2019 song contests
February 2019 events in Italy
Sanremo Music Festival by year